The 1920 South American Championship of Nations was the fourth continental championship for nations in South America. It was held in Valparaíso, Chile from 11 to 26 September 1920.

Overview

The participating countries were the host Chile, Argentina, Uruguay and Brazil as the defending champion. Uruguay regained the title lost in the last edition, thus becoming champion for the third time in the first four editions of the tournament. Ángel Romano was the top goalscorer alongside teammate José Pérez, with three goals, repeating his feat of three years earlier.

Brazil's 6–0 loss to Uruguay in this tournament would not be equaled until the 2014 FIFA World Cup, 94 years later, where they lost 7–1 against Germany.

Squads
For a complete list of participating squads see: 1920 South American Championship squads

Venues

Final round
Each team played one match against each of the other teams. Two points were awarded for a win, one point for a draw and zero points for a defeat.

Result

Goal scorers

3 goals

  José Pérez
  Ángel Romano

2 goals
  Raúl Echeverría

1 goal

  Miguel Dellavalle
  Julio Libonatti
  Ismael Alvariza
  Hernando Bolados
  Aurelio Domínguez
  Antonio Campolo
  José Piendibene
  Antonio Urdinarán

References

External links
 South American Championship 1920 at RSSSF

 
1920
International association football competitions hosted by Chile
1920 in South American football
1920 in Chilean football
1920 in Brazilian football
1920 in Argentine football
1920 in Uruguayan football
September 1920 sports events
October 1920 sports events